Café Griensteidl was a traditional Viennese café located at Michaelerplatz 2 across from St. Michael's Church and St. Michael's Gate at the Hofburg Palace in the Innere Stadt first district of Vienna, Austria. The cafe was founded in 1847 by former pharmacist Heinrich Griensteidl. In January 1897, the original building was demolished during the course of the renovation of Michaelerplatz. During the early twentieth century, the café was frequented by many artists, musicians, and writers, including Hugo von Hofmannsthal, Arthur Schnitzler, Arnold Schoenberg, Alexander Zemlinsky, Hermann Bahr, Friedrich Eckstein,  Rudolf Steiner, Hugo Wolf, and Stefan Zweig.

In 1990, the café was reopened and became a popular location among the Viennese coffeehouse culture.
As they could not afford the rising rents any more, Griensteidl closed in June 2017.

Gallery

See also
 List of restaurants in Vienna

References

External links
 Café Griensteidl 

Buildings and structures in Innere Stadt
Coffeehouses and cafés in Vienna
Coffeehouses and cafés in Austria
Buildings and structures in Vienna
1843 establishments in the Austrian Empire
2017 disestablishments in Austria
19th-century architecture in Austria